Long Xiaoqing (born 27 February 1997) is a Chinese archer. She won the silver medal in the women's team event at the 2019 Asian Archery Championships held in Bangkok, Thailand. She competed in the women's individual event at the 2020 Summer Olympics held in Tokyo, Japan.

References

External links
 

1997 births
Living people
Chinese female archers
Olympic archers of China
Archers at the 2020 Summer Olympics
Place of birth missing (living people)
21st-century Chinese women